Bishnupur High School is a co-educational higher secondary school  in Balasore, Odisha, India. It is one of the oldest and top-ranked high schools in the Balasore and the first in Bahanaga. The school offers grades from class IIIX to class X. It has two shifts, morning and day.

History 
Bishnupur High School is one of the oldest educational institution in East side of Odisha. The school was founded by Mr.Debendra Nath Panda on 23 March 1971, with 8 students. It was the first high school in Bahanaga Block. The then name of the school was "Baniha Uchha Bidyalaya". Debendra Nath Panda became the first Headmaster. This school opened under Government management as Bishnupur High School. In 1971, it was declared to be a government school and was renamed 'Bishnupur High School'. At that time, the school building was on Mr.Debendra Nath Panda's land at the north side of the Bishnupur Market and Hospital.

See also
 List of schools in Odisha

References

External links
 

Schools in Odisha
1971 establishments in Orissa
Educational institutions established in 1971